Saroja Kumari Jhuthu (born June 5, 1968) is an Indian sport shooter. She won the gold medal in the Women's 25m Pistol (Pairs) with Sushma Rana at the 2006 Commonwealth Games.

References

Jhutu, Saroja
ISSF pistol shooters
Jhutu, Saroja
Jhutu, Saroja
Jhutu, Saroja
1968 births
Commonwealth Games medallists in shooting
20th-century Indian women
20th-century Indian people
Medallists at the 2006 Commonwealth Games